May Township, Illinois may refer to the following:

May Township, Christian County, Illinois
May Township, Lee County, Illinois

See also
May Township (disambiguation)

Illinois township disambiguation pages